A Deer of Nine Colors (Chinese: 九色鹿; Pinyin: Jiǔ Sè Lù) is a Chinese animated film produced by Shanghai Animation Film Studio.  It is also referred to as "The Nine Colored Deer".

Background

The original story is based on the Buddhist Jataka tale of the same name, which was discovered as cave paintings in the Mogao Caves in Dunhuang, China.  The animated plot is essentially a spinoff.

Plot
In ancient times, a Persian merchant gets lost in a great windstorm. Suddenly, though, a spiritual deer of nine colors appears to guide the man. Later, the deer rescues a man drowning in a lake. In exchange, the man promises not to reveal the deer's whereabouts.
The man reaches an imperial palace. The king insists on hunting down the spiritual deer down to make clothes out of the deer skin. The man gives in to his greed and leads an army of warriors to the spot. He falls into the river again, hoping the deer will show up to rescue him. This time, all the warriors' arrows turn into dust and the man is drowned.

The film expands on the story. The deer is first seen rescuing small animals and insects when the tree they live in is blown down in a storm. The deer guides them to safety and persuades flowers to bloom out of season so the bees will have food. Then the deer saves a party of traveling merchants who have lost their way by magically moving the mountains to make a clear path for them. The story that a magical nine-colored deer has come to the country begins to spread among the people. Meanwhile, a man who sells medicinal spells and cures for snakebite is gathering herbs and falls into a lake. He is rescued by the deer and promises not to reveal its whereabouts. However, the vain queen of the land has also heard of the nine-colored deer and begins to pout and sulk, demanding a coat made from its fur. The king posts a huge reward for anyone who can tell him where to find it, and the potion merchant at once decides to betray his vow of secrecy and lead the king's hunters to the deer. The birds who were rescued are terrified and rush to the deer begging it to flee, but the deer is serene, saying it cannot be killed. The potion merchant pretends to be drowning again to bring the deer to the lake, but when it is surrounded and the hunters fire, the deer manifests a halo of divine light and sacred symbols surround it. The arrows turn to dust. The warriors all stand ashamed as the deer berates the potion merchant for his unfaithfulness and greed, and birds fly around him striking the man with pecks until he sinks into the lake.

Creators

References

External links
 
 The film at China's Movie Database
 The China Movie Database entry – Wayback Machine 

1981 animated films
1981 films
1980s animated short films
Chinese animated short films
Films about Buddhism
Buddhist animation
Jataka tales
1980s Mandarin-language films
Animals in Buddhism
Films about deer and moose